Jean-Paul Lakafia (born 29 June 1961) is a retired male javelin thrower from France; he was born in Nouméa, New Caledonia. He competed at the 1984 Summer Olympics in Los Angeles, California, finishing in 12th place. He set his personal best (86.60 metres) in 1985.

Achievements

Family
Lakafia's two sons, Pierre-Gilles and Raphaël, are both French rugby union players.

References

1961 births
Living people
French male javelin throwers
Athletes (track and field) at the 1984 Summer Olympics
Olympic athletes of France
People from Nouméa
New Caledonian javelin throwers
New Caledonian male athletes
Universiade medalists in athletics (track and field)
French people of Wallis and Futuna descent
Universiade bronze medalists for France